Ebenezer Brown ( – June 5, 1883) was an English-born wholesale merchant and political figure in British Columbia. He represented New Westminster from 1875 to 1878 and New Westminster City from 1878 to 1881 in the Legislative Assembly of British Columbia.

He was educated in England and came to British Columbia in 1858.  A stonemason, he erected the border monument at the Point Roberts-Tsawwassen boundary.

Political life
He served on the municipal council for New Westminster. Brown was president of the province's Executive Council (the cabinet) from February to September 1876. He resigned his seat in the assembly in November 1881 due to poor health.  Another version from a fellow MLA says he retired because of conflict of interest issues relating to railway developments.  Brown died two years later in New Westminster at the age of 59.

Brownsville across the Fraser River from New Westminster was named after Ebenezer Brown who built the first hotel there and also owned a wharf.

Electoral results

References

External links

1820s births
Year of birth uncertain
1883 deaths
English emigrants to pre-Confederation British Columbia
Independent MLAs in British Columbia
Canadian merchants